Leptostylus cretatellus is a species of longhorn beetles of the subfamily Lamiinae. It was described by Henry Walter Bates in 1863.

References

Leptostylus
Beetles described in 1863